Burton MacDonald (September 13, 1939 - October 20, 2022) was a Canadian biblical archaeologist specialising in the archaeology of Jordan. He was a professor at St. Francis Xavier University from 1965 to 2005, then a Senior Research Professor, and was made Professor Emeritus in the Religious Studies department in 2017.

Early life and education
MacDonald was born in Témiscamingue, Quebec, and attended St. Francis Xavier University (St. F. X.) and graduated with a BA in philosophy in 1960. He then began studies at St. Paul's Seminary, part of the University of Ottawa, where he obtained a baccalaureate in theology in 1962, a licentiate in theology in 1964, and a masters in religious education in 1965. After working as a priest and two years teaching at Xavier College (now Cape Breton University) and St. F. X., he enrolled in the Department of Near Eastern Languages and Literature at the Catholic University of America (CUA), where he obtained a PhD in 1974 with a dissertation on the biblical Tribe of Benjamin. In 1968, he was elected a member of the Catholic Biblical Association. He also studied at the École Biblique et Archéologique Française in Jerusalem between 1969 and 1971.

Academic career
MacDonald returned to St. F. X. in 1972 as a professor in the Department of Theology (later the Department of Religious Studies). He became a full professor in 1989 and served as the chair of the department between 1992 and 1995 and 1996 to 2000. He held the Father Edo Gatto Chair of Christian Studies in 2006.

MacDonald first became involved in archaeological fieldwork whilst studying at the École Biblique, including the sites of Gezer (1970) and Tell el-Hesi (1971) in Israel. He then joined excavations led by G. Ernest Wright at Idalion, Cyprus (1971). After further work at Idalion (1974) and Tell el-Hesi (1975), he was introduced to the archaeology of Jordan as a member of the Expedition to the Dead Sea Plain, directed by Walter E. Rast and R. Thomas Schaub (1977) and the Central Moab Survey, directed by J. Maxwell Miller (1979).  He also participated in the University of Toronto's The Wadi Tumilat Project, East Nile Delta, Tell al Maskhuta, Egypt, under the directorship of John S. Holladay (1978–1979).

MacDonald directed five major field projects, focusing on the Edomite plateau in southern Jordan:   
 The Wadi el-Hasa Archaeological Survey (1979-1983)
 The Southern Ghors and Northeast `Arabah Archaeological Survey (1985-1986)
 The Tafila-Busayra Archaeological Survey (1999-2001)
 The Ayl to Ras an-Naqb Archaeological Survey (2005-2007) 
 The Shammakh to Ayl Archaeological Survey (2010-2012)

Awards
 Research Award, St. Francis Xavier University (2000)
 G. Ernest Wright Publications Award, American Schools of Oriental Research (2005) 
 Hall of Honour, St. Francis Xavier University (2010)
A festschrift of collected essays in honour of MacDonald, Walking through Jordan: Essays in Honor of Burton MacDonald, was published in 2017.

Selected publications

 MacDonald, B.; Banning, E. B.; Clark, G. A., Majchrowicz, D. and Coinman, N. R.; Coinman, N., Clark, G. A. and Lindly, J.; Donahue, J. and Beynon, D. E., Harlan, J. R.; Betlyon, J.; King, G.; and Piccirillo, M. (1988), The Wadi el-Hasa Archaeological Survey 1979-1983, West-Central Jordan.  Wildrid Laurier University 
 MacDonald, B.; `Amr, K.; Broeder, N. H.; Skinner, H. C. W.; Meyer, C.; Neeley, M. P.; Reese, D. S.; and Whitcomb, D. S. (1992), The Southern Ghors and Northeast `Arabah Archaeological Survey.  Sheffield Archaeological Monographs 5.  J. R. Collis, Department of Archaeology and History, University of Sheffield 
 MacDonald, B. (1994), Ammon, Moab and Edom: Early States/Nations of Jordan in the Biblical Period (End of the 2nd and During the 1st Millennium B.C.).  Al Kutba 
 MacDonald, B., and Younker, R. (eds.) (1999), Ancient Ammon.  Brill 
 MacDonald, B. (2000), "East of the Jordan": Territories and Sites of the Hebrew Scriptures.  American Schools of Oriental Research 
 MacDonald, B.; Adams, R. B.; and Bienkowski, P. (eds.) (2001), The Archaeology of Jordan.  Levantine Archaeology 1.  Sheffield Academic 
 MacDonald, B.; Herr, L. G.; Neeley, M. P.; Gagos, T.; Moumani, K.; and Rockman, M. (2004), The Tafila-Busayra Archaeological Survey 1999-2001, West-Central Jordan.  Archaeological Reports 8.  American Schools of Oriental Research  
 MacDonald, B. (2010), Pilgrimage in Early Christian Jordan: A Literary and Archaeological Guide.  Oxbow 
 MacDonald, B.; Herr, L. G.; Quaintance, D. S.; Clark, G. A.; and Macdonald, M. C. A. (2012), The Ayl to Ras an-Naqab Archaeological Survey, Southern Jordan (2005-2007).  Archaeological Reports 16.  American Schools of Oriental Research 
 MacDonald, B. (2015), The Southern Transjordan Edomite Plateau and the Dead Sea Rift Valley: The Bronze Age to the Islamic Period (3800/3700 BC-AD 1917).  Oxbow 
 MacDonald, B.; Herr, L. G.; Quaintance, D. S.; Clark, G. A.; Hayajneh, H.; and Eggler, J. (2016), The Shammakh to Ayl Archaeological Survey, Southern Jordan (2010-2012).  Archaeological Reports 24.  American Schools of Oriental Research 
 Neeley, M. P.; Clark, G. A.; and Daviau, P. M. M. (eds.) (2017), Walking through Jordan: Essays in Honor of Burton MacDonald.  Equinox

References

1939 births
People from Abitibi-Témiscamingue
Canadian archaeologists
Archaeologists of the Near East
Biblical archaeology
St. Francis Xavier University alumni
Academic staff of St. Francis Xavier University
Living people
People from Inverness County, Nova Scotia